Michael Dominic Richard Guiry (born 1949), is an Irish botanist, who specialises in phycology (algae). See for example the articles. He is the founder and director of the algal database, AlgaeBase.

He is a graduate of both University College Cork and the University of London. In addition to his interest in the taxonomy and the databasing of algae, his algal site promotes the sustainable use of seaweed resources.

Since 2009 he has been an emeritus professor at the Ryan Institute, National University of Ireland, in Galway.

Some published names
Achnanthes armillaris (O.F.Müller) Guiry
Aglaothamnion priceanum Maggs, Guiry & Rueness
Capreolia implexa Guiry & Womersley
Chondracanthus canaliculatus (Harvey) Guiry
Chondracanthus corymbiferus (Kützing) Guiry
Nostoc flagelliforme Harvey ex Molinari, Calvo-Pérez & Guiry

(in AlgaeBase, as Guiry, over 300 algal species listed, not all currently accepted)

Publications 
(incomplete)

Books

Articles

 pdf

References 

20th-century Irish botanists
Living people
1949 births
Phycologists
21st-century Irish botanists